"Noche de Entierro (Nuestro Amor)" is a reggaeton song performed by artists Daddy Yankee, Wisin & Yandel, Héctor el Father, Zion and Tony Tun Tun. The song was produced by Luny Tunes, Tainy and Doble A & Nales and written by Gabriel Padilla. The song was featured in Mas Flow: Los Benjamins and is one of the most successful songs in the history of the genre. It is usually seen as a sequel to "Mayor Que Yo". "Noche de Entierro" features music instruments like flute, accordion, guitar, bass and electronic keyboard.

Music video
The music video features all the artists in separate places, accompanied with a group of girls dancing a choreography. Zion doesn't appear in the music video as well as his verse on the song (Luny Tunes and Tainy appear on the video during Zion's verse instead). The video version of the song has a little different instrumental, in which is aggregate an electronic keyboard effect and the bass (the same instrumental was used for the remix version).

Personnel
Tony Tun Tun, Wisin & Yandel, Héctor el Father, Zion, Daddy Yankee — lead vocals
Tony Tun Tun and Wisin — back vocals
Gabriel Cruz — lyrics and composer
Francisco Saldaña, Victor Cabrera, Marco Masis, Aaron Pena, Anthony Cotto — production
Francisco Saldaña — flute
Victor Cabrera — accordion
Marco Masis — guitar and bass 
Aaron Pena and Anthony Cotto — electronic keyboard

Lyrics
"Noche de Entierro" is a love song, who talks about a man who doesn't want to be with his girlfriend anymore, because she apparently prefers to be in love with another man. It also has a sexual theme, because near the end of the song Wisin says that one year later their separation, he want to have a "night of bury" (casual sex). The entire song was written and composed by the prestigious reggaeton composer Wise, who also wrote the previous Luny Tunes' hit "Mayor Que Yo".

Other remixes and versions
The radio-released remix included Daddy Yankee, Héctor el Father, Ivy Queen, Jowell & Randy and Arcángel & De La Ghetto. It was released digitally for the first time on June 21, 2021.
On the album Los Benjamins: La Continuación there appeared two remixes of the song:
The first was titled "Lo Nuestro Se Fue (Cumbia Remix)" which was sung by Ivy Queen, Alex Rivera, Daddy Yankee and Wisin.
The second remix "Luny Tunes and Nales Remix" was a "Noche de Entierro" hip hop-reggaeton remix whose English verses was sung by Nales of Doble A & Nales, Daddy Yankee and Wisin.
Ivy Queen and Wisin & Yandel performed the song on her 2008 World Tour that has held from the Coliseum of Puerto Rico. However, during the song as Ivy began her first verse, Yandel were sent out early and he began to sing causing Queen to lose her verse. Since it wasn't Yandel's turn to perform, Wisin had to wait until Yandel sang again to then sing his verse.

Chart positions

References

2006 singles
Daddy Yankee songs
Wisin & Yandel songs
Héctor el Father songs
Ivy Queen songs
Song recordings produced by Luny Tunes
Songs written by Wise (composer)